Wilhelm Emanuel Hansen (15 March 1884 – 20 June 1931) was a Norwegian rower. He competed in the men's eight event at the 1908 Summer Olympics.

References

External links
 

1884 births
1931 deaths
Norwegian male rowers
Olympic rowers of Norway
Rowers at the 1908 Summer Olympics
People from Sarpsborg
Sportspeople from Viken (county)